Asumi is a feminine Japanese given name and a surname. Notable people with the name include:

, Japanese badminton player
, Japanese actress
, Japanese voice actress and child model
, Japanese sprint canoeist
, Japanese singer and voice actress
, Japanese actress
, Japanese professional footballer
, Japanese former water polo player

Japanese feminine given names
Japanese-language surnames